Jhika Gali - is a town in Murree tehsil, Murree District, Punjab, Pakistan. It is located on the Rawalpindi to Murree road and contains many boarding schools

References

Populated places in Murree District
Galyat of Pakistan
Murree